Rohtak Division is one of the six divisions of the Indian state of Haryana. It consists of the districts of Jhajjar, Charkhi Dadri, Rohtak and Sonipat.

See also
Districts of Haryana

References

Divisions of Haryana